Lindsay Davenport defeated the defending champion Martina Hingis in a rematch of the previous year's final, 6–4, 6–2 to win the singles tennis title at the 1999 WTA Tour Championships.

Seeds

Notes:
  Monica Seles had qualified but pulled out due to right foot stress fracture

Alternates
  Elena Likhovtseva (replaced Serena Williams, defeated in first round)

Draw

See also
WTA Tour Championships appearances

References

Singles 1999
WTA Tour Championships